Parakramabahu VII was King of Kotte in the fifteenth century, who ruled from 1480/1 to 1484. He succeeded his father Bhuvanekabahu VI as king of Kotte and was succeeded by Parakramabahu VIII.

See also
 List of Sri Lankan monarchs
 History of Sri Lanka

References

External links
 Kings & Rulers of Sri Lanka
 Codrington's Short History of Ceylon

Monarchs of Kotte
House of Siri Sanga Bo
P
 Sinhalese Buddhist monarchs
P